The Soviet order of battle for the Battle of Stalingrad details the major combat units that fought in the Battle of Stalingrad. 
This shows the Soviet order of battle on 19 November 1942, the beginning of Operation Uranus.

Red Army Order of Battle

Stavka presentatives
 Army General G.K. Zhukov
 Colonel-General of Artillery N.N. Voronov
 Colonel-General A.M. Vasilevsky

Stalingrad Front
The Stalingrad Front, under the command of Colonel General Andrey Yeryomenko, assisted by Political Officer Nikita Khrushchev, included the following units:
 8th Air Army (General Timofey Khryukin)
 28th Army (Lieutenant General Dmitry Ryabyshev)
 Rifle Divisions:  34th Guards, 248th
 Special Brigades:  52nd, 152nd, 159th
  Tank Brigades: 6th Guards  
 Front Reserve: 330th Rifle Division, 85th Tank Bde
 51st Army (General N.I. Trufanov)
 Rifle Divisions: 15th Guards, 91st, 126th, 302nd
 Special Brigades: 38th
 Tank Brigades: 254th 
 Armoured formations added for Operation Uranus:  4th Mechanised Corps, 4th Cavalry Corps
 57th Army (General F.I. Tolbukhin)
 Rifle Divisions: 169th, 422nd
 Special Brigades: 143rd
 Tank Brigades: 90th, 235th
 Armoured formations added for Operation Uranus:  13th Mechanized Corps
 62nd Army (General V.I. Chuikov)
 Rifle Divisions: 13th Guards, 37th Guards, 39th Guards, 45th, 95th, 112th, 138th, 193rd, 196th, 244th, 284th, 308th, 10th NKVD
 Naval Infantry Brigades: 92nd   
 Special Brigades: 42nd, 115th, 124th, 149th, 160th
 Tank Brigades: 84th, 137th, 189th
64th Army (General M.S. Shumilov)
 Rifle Divisions: 36th Guards, 29th, 38th, 157th, 204th
 Naval Infantry Brigades: 154th
 Special Brigades: 66th, 93rd, 96th, 97th
 Tank Brigades: 13th, 56th

Don Front
Colonel General Konstantin Rokossovsky's Don Front included the following units:
 24th Army (General I.V. Galanin)
 Rifle Divisions: 49th, 84th, 120th, 173rd, 233rd, 260th, 273rd
 Tank Brigades: 10th
 65th Army (General Lieutenant-General P.I. Batov)
 Rifle Divisions: 4th Guards, 27th Guards, 40th Guards, 23rd, 24th, 252nd, 258th, 304th, 321st
 Tank Brigades: 121st
 66th Army (Major-General A.S. Zhadov)
 Rifle Divisions:  64th, 99th, 116th, 226th, 299th, 343rd
 Tank Brigades: 58th
16th Air Army (Major-General S.I. Rudenko)

Southwestern Front
The Southwestern Front, commanded by Army General Nikolai Vatutin, included the following units: 
 1st Guards Army (General D.D. Lelyushenko)
 Rifle Divisions:  1st, 153rd, 197th, 203rd, 266th, 278th
 Front Reserve: 1st Guards Mechanised Corps
 5th Tank Army (General P.L. Romanenko)
 Rifle Divisions:  14th Guards, 47th Guards, 50th Guards, 119th, 159th, 346th
 Armoured formations added for Operation Uranus:  1st Tank Corps, 26th Tank Corps, 8th Cavalry Corps
 21st Army (Major-General Ivan Chistyakov)
 Rifle Divisions:  63rd, 76th, 96th, 277th, 293rd, 333rd
 Tank Regiments: 4th Guards, 1st, 2nd   
 Armoured formations added for Operation Uranus:  4th Tank Corps, 3rd Guards Cavalry Corps
 2nd Air Army (Colonel K. Smirnov)
 17th Air Army (Major-General S.A. Krasovsky)

Footnotes

Citations

Bibliography
 

1942 in the Soviet Union
1943 in the Soviet Union
Battle of Stalingrad
World War II orders of battle